Club Deportivo Quintanar is a football team based in Quintanar de la Orden in the autonomous community of Castilla-La Mancha.

Founded in 1998, it plays in the Primera Autonómica Preferente. Its stadium is Los Molinos with a capacity of 2,000 seats.

History

CD Quintanar was founded in 1961, in 1977 disappeared. In 1977 was founded as Sporting Quintanar and disappeared in 1992. The current club is founded as Atlético Quintanar-Santa Gema and in the season 2000/01 is changed the name to CD Quintanar.

Club background
CD Quintanar - (1961–1977)
Sporting Quintanar - (1977–1992)

Atlético Quintanar-Santa Gema - (1998–2000/01)
CD Quintanar - (2000/01–Currently)

Season to season

1 seasons in Tercera División

External links
Official website 
1ª Autonómica
Futbolme.com profile

Football clubs in Castilla–La Mancha
Divisiones Regionales de Fútbol clubs
Association football clubs established in 1998
1998 establishments in Spain